Bernard Yin Yeung (born September 9, 1953) is a Hong Kong-born American economist and academic. He was the dean of the NUS Business School from June 2008 to May 2019, where he is also the Stephen Riady Distinguished Professor.

Early life
Bernard Yeung was born in Hong Kong in 1953, where he also spent his childhood. He graduated from the University of Western Ontario, where he earned a bachelor's degree in mathematics and economics in 1979. He earned a master in business administration followed by a PhD from the Booth School of Business at the University of Chicago.

Career
Yeung was an associate professor at the University of Alberta from 1986 to 1988, and he was a professor of international business at the University of Michigan's Ross School of Business from 1988 to 1999. He was the Abraham Krasnoff Professor in Global Business, Economics and Management at New York University's Stern School of Business from 1999 to 2010.

Yeung was the dean of the NUS Business School from June 2008 to May 2019, where he is also the Stephen Riady Distinguished Professor. He is also the Honorary Co-Chair of Guanghua School of Management at Peking University. Additionally, he has been an advisory university professor at East China Normal University since 2006.

Personal life
Yeung is a naturalized U.S. citizen.

References

Living people
1953 births
University of Western Ontario alumni
University of Chicago Booth School of Business alumni
Academic staff of the University of Alberta
New York University Stern School of Business faculty
Academic staff of the National University of Singapore
Academic staff of the East China Normal University
Singaporean economists
Business school deans
Singaporean university and college faculty deans
Naturalized citizens of the United States